The 7th Annual TV Week Logie Awards were presented on Friday 26 March 1965 at Palais de Danse, St Kilda in Melbourne and broadcast on the Nine Network. Gerald Lyons from the ABC was the Master of Ceremonies. American television actress Donna Douglas was a guest presenter. This article lists the winners of Logie Awards (Australian television) for 1965:

Awards

Gold Logie
Most Popular Personality on Australian Television
Winner:
Jimmy Hannan

Logie

National
Best Female Personality
Winner:
Dawn Lake, Sound of Music

Best Teenage Performer
Winner:
Billy Thorpe

Best Live Show
Winner:
Sound of Music, Nine Network

Best Documentary Series
Winner:
Project 64, Nine Network

Best New Show
Winner:
Mavis Bramston Show, Seven Network

Best Australian Drama Series
Winner:
Homicide, Seven Network

Best Single Documentary
Winner:
New Heart For Graham

Most Outstanding National Show
Winner:
BP Super Show, Nine Network

Best Overseas Show
Winner:
The Beverly Hillbillies

Outstanding Services to News Reading
Winner:
Sir Eric Pearce

Victoria
Most Popular Male
Winner:
Graham Kennedy

Most Popular Female
Winner:
Toni Lamond

Most Popular Program
Winner:
Tonight, Nine Network

New South Wales
Most Popular Male
Winner:
Bobby Limb

Most Popular Female
Judy Stone

Most Popular Program
Winner:
Tonight, Nine Network

South Australia
Most Popular Male
Winner:
Ernie Sigley

Most Popular Female
Winner:
Glenys O'Brien

Most Popular Program
Winner:
Country and Western Hour, Nine Network

Queensland
Most Popular Male
Dick McCann

Most Popular Female
Winner:
Jackie Ellison

Most Popular Program
Winner:
Theatre Royal, Seven Network

Special Award for News Reading
Winner:
Melody Welsh

Tasmania
Most Popular Male
Winner:
Graeme Smith

Most Popular Female
Winner:
Robyn Nevin

External links

Australian Television: 1962-1965 Logie Awards
TV Week Logie Awards: 1965

1965 television awards
1965 in Australian television
1965